In mathematics, more specifically general topology, the double origin topology is an example of a topology given to the plane R2 with an extra point, say 0*, added. In this case, the double origin topology gives a topology on the set , where ∐ denotes the disjoint union.

Construction 

For the point 0, the basis, indexed by n, is defined to be:

In a similar way, the basis of neighbourhoods of 0* is defined to be:

Properties 

The space }, along with the double origin topology is an example of a Hausdorff space, although it is not completely Hausdorff. In terms of compactness, the space }, along with the double origin topology fails to be either compact, paracompact or locally compact, however, X is second countable. Finally, it is an example of an arc connected space.

References 

General topology